Peter B. Morin is an American attorney, novelist, and politician who represented the 2nd Barnstable District in the Massachusetts House of Representatives from 1985 to 1991. He is the author of the novel Diary of a Small Fish which is loosely based on his experiences as a politician.

References

1955 births
Boston University School of Law alumni
Republican Party members of the Massachusetts House of Representatives
University of Vermont alumni
Living people